Frederick Cofield (born January 4, 1962) is a retired American basketball player. He was a 6'3" (1.90 m) and 190 lb (86 kg) guard.

Born in Ypsilanti, Michigan, Cofield played collegiately for the University of Oregon and Eastern Michigan University.

He was selected by the New York Knicks in the 4th round (73rd pick overall) of the 1985 NBA Draft.

He played for the Knicks (1985–86) and Chicago Bulls (1986–87) in the NBA for 50 games.

External links

1962 births
Living people
Albany Patroons players
American expatriate basketball people in Australia
American expatriate basketball people in Spain
American expatriate basketball people in Venezuela
Basketball players from Michigan
CB Valladolid players
Chicago Bulls players
Cocodrilos de Caracas players
Eastern Michigan Eagles men's basketball players
Liga ACB players
New York Knicks draft picks
New York Knicks players
Oregon Ducks men's basketball players
Point guards
Rapid City Thrillers players
Rockford Lightning players
Shooting guards
Sportspeople from Ypsilanti, Michigan
American men's basketball players
American expatriate basketball people in the Philippines
Barangay Ginebra San Miguel players
Philippine Basketball Association imports